The majority of the territory of Western Sahara is currently administered by the Kingdom of Morocco. As such, the majority of the economic activity of Western Sahara happens in the framework of the economy of Morocco.

In the Moroccan-administered territory, fishing and phosphate mining are the principal sources of income for the population. The territory lacks sufficient rainfall for sustainable agricultural production; hence, most of the food for the urban population must be imported. Trade and other economic activities are controlled by the Moroccan government.

The Free Zone (POLISARIO-administered territory) is mainly uninhabited. There is practically no economical infrastructure and the main activity is camel herding nomadism. The government-in-exile of the Polisario Front had also signed contracts for oil exploration, but there is no practical work, due to the fact that the zones given are in the Moroccan-controlled part of the territory.

Key agricultural products from Western Sahara include fruits and vegetables (grown in the few oases), as well as camels, sheep and goats.
Fishing and oil exploration contracts concerning Western Sahara are sources of political tension.

Energy consumption
Electricity – production: 0 (all estimates are for 2015)
Electricity – consumption: 0
Oil – production: 
Oil – consumption:

Disputes over natural resources
Fishing and oil exploration contracts concerning Western Sahara are sources of political tension. In 2015, a European court invalidated a trade deal between the European Union (EU) and Morocco that involved Western Sahara, prompting a diplomatic backlash from Morocco. In 2018, the European Court of Justice ruled that a fishing treaty between the EU and the Moroccan government did not include fishing grounds off the coast of Western Sahara. In April 2010, the Norwegian state-owned salmon company EWOS stopped the purchases of fish oil from Western Sahara and Morocco (with an amount of around 10 million euros annually, and estimated between 12,000 and 20,000 tons of fish oil in total), for "not being in line with the Norwegian authorities' recommendations".

In 2002, the petroleum companies TotalEnergies and Kerr-McGee were awarded contracts to explore for oil in the region. In December 2004, French oil company TotalEnergies decided not to renew their license off Western Sahara. In May 2006, Kerr-McGee decided to not renew the contract signed with the Moroccan Authorities. The US-based firm Kosmos Energy began a contract to explore offshore from Western Sahara in 2013, prompting criticism from activist groups such as Western Sahara Resource Watch. Desertec, a Munich-based solar energy company, declined to place a plant in Western Sahara for "reputational reasons."

See also
Economy of Morocco
Legal status of Western Sahara
 Western Saharan cuisine

References

External links

SADR Oil and Gas exploration, licence offering

 
African Union member economies